Abominator is an Australian black/death metal band formed in Melbourne, Australia, in 1994. Their lyrics commonly deal with war and spirituality. They have been compared to Angelcorpse and Morbid Angel.

History
Abominator was formed in Melbourne in 1994 by Andrew Undertaker and Chris Volcano (formerly of Deströyer 666) and self-released their first demo, Barbarian War Worship in May 1995, which featured six tracks. It was later rereleased as a split with Swedish death metal band Mornaland. In late 1995, Dave Deathsaw (guitars) and Gary Gestapo (Bass) were added to the lineup and performed numerous gigs, including with cult black metal band Bestial Warlust. The vocalist for Bestial Warlust, Damon Bloodstorm (bass, vocals) joined Abominator about this time, and Gary Gestapo was dismissed.

In 1997 they recorded their next release, another demo titled The Conqueror Possessed and Dave Deathsaw departed the next year. Abominator achieved a major success in the US, signing a deal with Necropolis Records. They released Damnations Prophecy, and recorded a track for Necropolis' 1999 compilation album, Thrashing Holocaust. Around 2000, they began writing and recording their next album, Subersives for Lucifer, but Necropolis decided that they no longer wished to support Abominator and rendered their contract void.  However, Abominator managed to secure a contract with Osmose Records shortly after, and Subversives for Lucifer was released under Osmose. After the release of this album Damon Bloodstorm departed.

In early 2001, Max Krieg joined the band on vocals. They appeared in Osmose Records' "World Domination" DVD in early 2002, and recorded their next album, a limited edition LP titled Nuctemeron Descent later that year which was released in 2003. The marketing campaign for this album was very successful, and Abominator was soon playing alongside the likes of Deströyer 666, Hobbs' Angel of Death and Mayhem and appeared on "Osmose NoisyMotions", a two-and-a-half-hour DVD featuring bands such as Immortal, Dark Tranquility and Absu. Abominator was also booked to play in the Bloodlust 2004 festival, but Max Krieg unexpectedly left the band and the country, leaving Abominator without a vocalist and forcing them to cancel all remaining shows. They were also released by Osmose in 2004 and soon switched labels, signing a two-album deal with the Displeased label, and released The Eternal Conflagration in May 2006.

Discography
Barbarian War Worship, Demo, 1995
The Conqueror Possessed, Demo, 1997
Prelude to World Funeral..., Split, 1997
Damnation's Prophecy, Album, 1999
Subversives for Lucifer, Album, 2001
Nuctemeron Descent, Album, 2003
The Eternal Conflagration, Album, 2006
Evil Proclaimed, Album, 2015

References

External links
Abominator.net
Review of The Eternal Conflagration on Metalrage.com
Masterful Magazine interview 30 June 2006 

Musical groups established in 1994
Australian death metal musical groups
Musical groups from Melbourne
Australian black metal musical groups
Blackened death metal musical groups
Australian heavy metal musical groups
Australian musical trios
1994 establishments in Australia